Juan Eugenio Hartzenbusch (6 September 1806 – 2 August 1880) was a Spanish dramatist. He was the Director of the National Library of Spain until he retired in 1875.

Biography
Hartzenbusch was born in Madrid, Spain. His father was a German furniture carpenter and his mother a Spanish woman with the name María Josefa Martínez Calleja. Hartzenbusch's childhood was spent as an apprentice in his father's shop in order to become a cabinet-maker. He studied French 1815-1818 and then took a four-year course in the Jesuit College of San Isidro el Real in Madrid where he studied principally rhetoric, Latin, and philosophy. He followed his father's trade till 1830, when he learned shorthand and joined the staff of the Gaceta. He married Doña María Bernardina Morgue in 1830. She died in 1836. His earliest dramatic essays were translations from Molière, Voltaire and Alexandre Dumas, père; he then turned to adapting old Spanish plays, and in 1837 produced his first original play, Los amantes de Teruel, the subject of which had previously been used by Andrés Rey de Artieda, Tirso de Molina and Juan Pérez de Montalbán. Los amantes de Teruel at once made the author's reputation, but Doña Mencía (1840) and Alfonso el Casto (1841) were disappointments; it was not till 1845 that he repeated his former success with La jura en Santa Gadea.

In 1900, Don Eugenio Hartzenbusch, Juan's son, published Bibliografía in Madrid which presents in succinct form as complete a list of his father's writings. It remains a testimonial to the lifelong indefatigable industry of this prolific writer. Summarized, the record there given comprises about 15 collections, including various editions of his works, 94 dramatic works, 236 poems 231 fables in verse, 19 addresses, 8 biographical articles, 15 stories, 14 articles depicting manners and customs, 9 literary criticism, 3 dramatic criticism, 33 prologues, 22 notes and articles referring to "Don Quixote" 22 miscellaneous articles, and 9 works of different authors collected and annotated. Such a record of literary activity tells its own story. It is the life of an author and a scholar, who through hard work and conscientious effort, secured for himself an honorable place among Spain's men of letters.

Hartzenbusch was the chief librarian at the Biblioteca Nacional, National Library, from 1862 to 1875, and was an indefatigable editor of many national classics. Inferior in inspiration to other contemporary Spanish dramatists, Hartzenbusch excelled his rivals in versatility and in conscientious workmanship.

As a member of the Real Academia Española, he edited works from Tirso de Molina (12 vols., Madrid, 1839–42), Calderón de la Barca (4 vols., 1849–51), Juan Ruiz de Alarcón (1852), and Lope de Vega (4 vols., 1853), among others.

After retiring from the National Library in 1875, his strength of body and mind began to give way, and after losing his second wife, Salvadora Hiriart, he failed rapidly and died at his home in Madrid on 2 August 1880. The Real Academia Española, the Spanish Academy, did him the honor of accompanying his body to its last resting place, the Cementerio de la Sacramental de San Ginés y San Luis.

Notes

References

Further reading
 Chevalier, Maxime. "Pour les sources des fables d'Hartzenbusch". In: Bulletin Hispanique, tome 81, n°3-4, 1979. pp. 303–310. DOI: https://doi.org/10.3406/hispa.1979.4399; www.persee.fr/doc/hispa_0007-4640_1979_num_81_3_4399

External links 
 
 
 

1806 births
1880 deaths
Members of the Royal Spanish Academy
Spanish male dramatists and playwrights
Spanish people of German descent
19th-century Spanish dramatists and playwrights
19th-century male writers